Eupanacra regularis is a moth of the  family Sphingidae.

Distribution 
It is known from India and south-east Asia, including Myanmar, Thailand, Malaysia (Peninsular) and Indonesia (Sumatra, Borneo, Java).

Description 
It is similar to Eupanacra automedon.

Subspecies
Eupanacra regularis regularis
Eupanacra regularis continentalis (Gehlen, 1930) (India)

References

Eupanacra
Moths described in 1875